FAIF (Free as in freedom) is a distinction between meanings of free summarized by the terms libre and gratis

Faif may also refer to:

Acronyms 
FAIF, the fleet marine force of the Argentina Marines
Free as in Freedom, 2002 biography by Sam Williams
Fjärdsjömåla AIF, a Swedish football club
Garry Faif (1942–2002), Soviet and French architect, sculptor and engineer

See also
Football Association of the Irish Free State (FAIFS), former name of the Football Association of Ireland, the governing body for association football in the Republic of Ireland